Mutluca is a village in the District of Karpuzlu, Aydın Province, Turkey. As of 2021 it had a population of 93 people.

References

Villages in Karpuzlu District